Charissa Suli is the President-Elect of the Uniting Church in Australia (UCA) for 2024–27. She is the youngest and the first person of colour to serve in this role. She is also the second ordained woman to hold this position.

Career 
Suli was called to ministry as part of the Cecil Gribble Tongan Congregation, Dee Why Uniting Church.

Suli was ordained in 2014 and served at Dapto Uniting Church, New South Wales. Throughout her ministry in this congregation it became a more multi-cultural church, reflecting the multicultural nature of the broader UCA.

Suli was Cross Cultural consultant in the NSW/ACT Synod's Board of Mission.

Suli has been the convener of the Tongan National Conference, specialising in mentoring youth and young adults and creating bridges between first and second generation Tongans in Australia.

Suli has been working as a National Consultant in the Assembly Resourcing Unit for the UCA.

Suli has been featured on the Australian Women Preach podcast preaching on John 6: 24–35, talking about surprises. She also has written for Common Grace's advent series.

Election 
On 18 July 2021 it was announced that Suli had been selected as the President-Elect, succeeding Rev Sharon Hollis in the role. Hollis was the first ordained woman to serve in this role.

Suli along with Michelle Cooke and Viniana Ravetali were the final nominations meaning that the 16th president would be a woman, regardless of the final vote.  Haloti Kailahi had been nominated but his nomination was removed before the final vote.

Family 
Suli and her husband, Langi, have four children.

References 

Year of birth missing (living people)
Living people
Uniting Church in Australia ministers
Australian Protestant religious leaders